Charlie Murray may refer to:

 Charlie Murray (umpire), Australian rules football player and coach
 Charlie Murray (golfer) (1882–1938), Canadian golfer